= Columbus Unified High School =

High school in Columbus, Kansas, US

Coordinates: 37.1699°N 94.8495°W

Columbus Unified High School is a high school in Columbus, Kansas.
